The Mountain is the third album by American blues-rock band Heartless Bastards. It is their third release on Fat Possum Records and their first album without original drummer Kevin Vaughn and bassist Mike Lamping.  The album was produced by Spoon producer Mike McCarthy and was released on February 3, 2009.

Track listing 
All tracks written by Erika Wennerstrom.
 "The Mountain" – 5:19
 "Could Be So Happy" – 3:51
 "Early in the Morning" – 2:27
 "Hold Your Head High" – 5:05
 "Out at Sea" – 3:24
 "Nothing Seems the Same" – 5:38
 "Wide Awake" – 3:05
 "So Quiet" – 2:41
 "Had to Go" – 7:29
 "Witchypoo" – 5:22
 "Sway" – 5:53

Personnel 
Erika Wennerstrom – guitar, vocals
Marc Nathan – guitar
Willie "Maceo 2" Rhodes – guitar
Billy White – bass
Doni Schroader – drums
Zy Orange Lyn – violin, mandolin

2009 albums
Heartless Bastards albums